Anna Letycia Quadros ( September 25, 1929 — October 30, 2018) was a Brazilian artist and educator.

Quadros took part in the creation of the Grupo Frente with Serpa. In 1959, she attended a workshop at the Museum of Modern Art, Rio de Janeiro led by Edith Behring.

She taught engraving at the Museum of Modern Art in Rio de Janeiro from 1960 to 1966, where she especially studied engraving on metal also called metalcuts. She worked there with many other engravers who became also well-known, like Anna Bella Geiger and Ruth Bessoudo. She taught engraving in Santiago; in 1961, she was named an honorary professor at the Pontifical Catholic University of Chile. From 1977 to 1998, she taught an engraving workshop at the Museu do Ingá in Niterói. Quadros also worked as a scenery and costume designer for the stage, mainly with playwright Maria Clara Machado.

Her work has appeared in both solo and group exhibitions in Brazil and internationally. She participated in the 1959 Paris Biennale and the 1962 Venice Biennale.

In 1998, Angela Ancora da Luz published the book Anna Letycia.

In 2012, the Museu Nacional de Belas Artes held a retrospective of her work.

Death
Anna Letycia Quadros died on October 30, 2018, in Rio de Janeiro.

References 

1929 births
2018 deaths
20th-century Brazilian women artists
21st-century Brazilian women artists
20th-century Brazilian artists
21st-century Brazilian artists
Brazilian engravers
Women engravers
20th-century engravers
People from Teresópolis
Academic staff of the Pontifical Catholic University of Chile